Woodcrest, also known as the Homer Reboul Estate, is a national historic district located at Nissequogue in Suffolk County, New York.  The district encompasses an estate with two contributing buildings and two contributing structure.  The estate house is a large two story Shingle Style structure, with a gambrel roof and an attached service wing, built in 1895. It is surrounded by formal gardens. Also on the property are a contributing carriage house and pump house.

It was added to the National Register of Historic Places in 1993.

References

Houses on the National Register of Historic Places in New York (state)
Shingle Style architecture in New York (state)
Houses completed in 1895
Houses in Suffolk County, New York
Historic districts on the National Register of Historic Places in New York (state)
National Register of Historic Places in Suffolk County, New York